Mike Schuchart (born April 6, 1962) is an American professional golfer who played on the PGA Tour and the Nationwide Tour and is currently an assistant coach for the University of Nebraska's women's golf team, a position he has held since 2002. Schuhart is also a teaching professional at the Wilderness Ridge Golf Club in Lincoln, Nebraska.

Amateur career
Schuchart was born in Omaha, Nebraska. He played college golf at the University of Nebraska for four years. He was named the Nebraska Amateur of the Year in 1984 and graduated from Nebraska in 1985. He turned professional the following year.

Professional career
Schuchart went to PGA Tour qualifying school in 1989 and did well enough to earn his tour card for 1990. He struggled in his rookie season, making only 7 of 28 cuts. He played in some tournaments on the Nationwide Tour in 1991 and 1992 but did not play on the tour full-time. He went back to Q-School in 1992 and was successful in obtaining his PGA Tour card for 1993. He did better on tour in 1993, making 11 of 24 cuts and recording a top-10 finish, but did not do well enough to retain his tour card. He also played a few tournaments on the Nationwide Tour in 1993 and picked up his first professional victory at the Nike Panama City Beach Classic. He played on the Nationwide Tour full-time in 1994 and picked up his second professional victory at the Nike Tour Championship. In 1995 he also played full-time on the Nationwide Tour and picked up his third victory at the Nike Ozarks Open. Schuchart continued to play on the Nationwide Tour until 1997, taking a hiatus in 1998 and 1999 before returning in 2000. His final year on the Nationwide Tour was 2001. He went to PGA Tour Q-School in 1999 and 2000 but was not able to earn his tour card.

Schuchart won the Nebraska Open in 2002 and 2003 and was named the 2003 Nebraska Teacher of the Year. In 2003 he was also the Nebraska PGA Section Club Professional Champion. He has been named the Nebraska PGA Player of the Year three times. He also represented his country in the 1992 National PGA Cup.

Professional wins (11)

Nike Tour wins (3)

Nike Tour playoff record (1–0)

Other wins (8)
1991 Nebraska PGA Championship
1992 Nebraska PGA Championship
1997 3 events on the Prairie Golf Tour
1998 3 events on the Prairie Golf Tour
2002 Nebraska Open, Nebraska PGA Championship
2003 Nebraska Open, Nebraska PGA Championship
2005 Nebraska PGA Championship
2006 Nebraska PGA Championship
2007 Nebraska PGA Championship
2008 Nebraska PGA Championship

Results in major championships

Note: Schuchart never played in the Masters Tournament nor The Open Championship.

CUT = missed the half-way cut

U.S. national team appearances
PGA Cup: 1992 (winners)

See also
1989 PGA Tour Qualifying School graduates
1992 PGA Tour Qualifying School graduates

References

External links
Profile on Nebraska's official athletic site

American male golfers
PGA Tour golfers
Golfers from Nebraska
University of Nebraska–Lincoln alumni
Sportspeople from Omaha, Nebraska
1962 births
Living people